Mount Cuba Historic District is a national historic district at Mount Cuba, New Castle County, Delaware.  It encompasses twelve contributing buildings, one contributing site, and four contributing structures on seven properties that lie along County Road 261.  Notable buildings include the Speakman's grist mill, saw mill, and adjoining stone house; and a number of frame dwellings in a variety of popular mid to late 19th-century architectural styles including Gothic Revival. The contributing site is the Mt. Cuba picnic grounds.

It was added to the National Register of Historic Places in 1979.

References

Historic districts on the National Register of Historic Places in Delaware
Gothic Revival architecture in Delaware
Historic districts in New Castle County, Delaware
National Register of Historic Places in New Castle County, Delaware